Al-Namrood is a Saudi Arabian black metal band. The name means "Nimrod", a Babylonian king, and the group chose the name as a form of defiance against religion. The members are anonymous since their identification could lead to punishment of death from Saudi Arabian authorities.

Al-Namrood has released numerous albums and singles since it began in 2008. The band has also released three music videos and are currently signed to Shaytan Productions (Canada).

Discography

Studio albums
Astfhl Al Thar (2009, استُفحِل الثأر)
Estorat Taghoot (2010, أُسطورة طاغوت)
Kitab Al Awthan (2012, كتابُ الأوثان)
Heen Yadhar Al Ghasq (2014, حينَ يَظهر الغسق)
Diaji Al Joor (2015, دياجي الجور)
Enkar (2017, إنكار)
Wala'at (2020, ولاءات)
Worship the Degenerate (2022)

Singles and EPs
Atbaa Al-Namrood (2008, أتباع النمرود)
Jaish Al-Namrood (2013, جيش النمرود)
Ana Al Tughian (2015, أنا الطُغيان)

Music videos

Compilations
Ten Years of Resistance (2018)

References

External links
  (archive)

Saudi Arabian black metal musical groups
Saudi Arabian dissidents